The election for Governor of Rivers State took place on 11 April 2015. People's Democratic Party candidate Ezenwo Wike, a former Minister of State for Education defeated All Progressives Congress candidate Dakuku Peterside and Labour Party candidate Tonye Princewill.

The Governor and Deputy Governor of Rivers State are elected on the same ticket.

PDP primary
People's Democratic Party candidate Ezenwo Wike ran an effective campaign and was unopposed for the 8 December 2014 Primary. He won with 97.65 percent of the vote against four other opponents, including Lee Maeba, the senator for Rivers State South East constituency.

Candidates
Ezenwo Wike, former Minister of State for Education
Dumbari Dimkpa
West Ibinabo 
Emmanuel Georgewill 
Lee Maeba, Senator

Results

APC primary

Candidates
 Dakuku Peterside, member of the House of Representatives

Results

General election

Results

See also
Nigerian National Assembly election, 2015 (Rivers State)

References

 
Rivers State gubernatorial elections
Gubernatorial
Rivers State gubernatorial election
April 2015 events in Nigeria
Governorship of Ezenwo Nyesom Wike